Jain Pei is an engineer from Simon Fraser University in Burnaby, British Columbia. He was named a Fellow of the Institute of Electrical and Electronics Engineers (IEEE) in 2014 for his contributions to data mining and knowledge discovery.

References

Fellow Members of the IEEE
Living people
Year of birth missing (living people)
Place of birth missing (living people)
Academic staff of Simon Fraser University